Ron Kinder (18 August 1924 – 30 May 2013) was  a former Australian rules footballer who played with Fitzroy in the Victorian Football League (VFL).

Notes

External links 

1924 births
2013 deaths
Australian rules footballers from Victoria (Australia)
Fitzroy Football Club players
Northcote Football Club players